Toms Creek is a  long 4th order tributary to the Ararat River in Surry County, North Carolina.

Course
Toms Creek rises on the Big Creek divide about 0.25 miles west of Woodville, North Carolina.  Toms Creek then flows south before turning southwest to join the Ararat River at about 5 miles northeast of Pine Hill.

Watershed
Toms Creek drains  of area, receives about 48.1 in/year of precipitation, has a wetness index of 348.20, and is about 58% forested.

See also
List of rivers of North Carolina

References

Rivers of North Carolina
Rivers of Surry County, North Carolina